António Vicente Campinas (1910–1998) was a Portuguese poet from Algarve. His works include the book Raiz da Serenidade. He is especially famous for his poem "Cantar Alentejano", in honor of Catarina Eufémia. The poem, with music by José Afonso, is on the album "Cantigas de Maio", released on Christmas Day, 1971. (Hear part of the song here.)

References

External links
(In Portuguese)
Poemas em memória de Catarina Eufémia
Poema "Manhã de Paz"
Poemas

1910 births
1998 deaths
20th-century Portuguese poets
Portuguese male poets
20th-century male writers